Prikanalny is a rural locality (a settlement) in Kirovskoye Rural Settlement, Sredneakhtubinsky District, Volgograd Oblast, Russia. The population was 96 as of 2010. There are 7 streets.

Geography 
Prikanalny is located near the Gniloy Erik, 22 km northwest of Srednyaya Akhtuba (the district's administrative centre) by road. Starenky is the nearest rural locality.

References 

Rural localities in Sredneakhtubinsky District